The 2014–15 McNeese State Cowgirls basketball team represented McNeese State University during the 2014–15 NCAA Division I women's basketball season. The Cowgirls, led by eighth year head coach Brooks Donald-Williams, played all their home games at Burton Coliseum. They are members of the Southland Conference.  The team completed the 2014–15 season with an 18–14 overall record and an 11–7 Southland Conference record.  The Cowgirls, seeded fifth in the 2015 Southland Conference Tournament, fell to eighth seed Houston Baptist 68–70 in the first round of the Southland Conference tournament.  They received an invitation to the 2015 Women's Basketball Invitational tournament.  In first round play, the Cowgirls defeated the Furman Paladins.  The 2014–15 season ended when the team fell to the Louisiana–Lafayette Ragin' Cajuns in the second round of the tournament.

Roster

Schedule
Source

|-
!colspan=9 style="background:#0000FF; color:#FFD700;"| Out of Conference Schedule

|-
!colspan=9 style="background:#0000FF; color:#FFD700;"| Southland Conference Schedule

|-
!colspan=9 style="background:#0000FF; color:#FFD700;"| Southland Conference Tournament

|-
!colspan=9 style="background:#0000FF; color:#FFD700;"| 2015 Women's Basketball Invitational

See also
2014–15 McNeese State Cowboys basketball team

References

McNeese Cowgirls basketball seasons
McNeese State
McNeese State
McNeese State